Cavedago (Ciavedàc or Ciavedài in local dialect) is a comune (municipality) in Trentino in the northern Italian region Trentino-Alto Adige/Südtirol, located about  northwest of Trento.

Cavedago borders the following municipalities: Spormaggiore, Fai della Paganella, Molveno, and Andalo.

Demographic evolution

References

Cities and towns in Trentino-Alto Adige/Südtirol